This is a list of MPs elected to the House of Commons at the 1857 United Kingdom general election, arranged by constituency.



Notes

See also
1857 United Kingdom general election
List of parliaments of the United Kingdom

1857 United Kingdom general election
General election
1857
List
UK MPs